Lee Sung-hun is a South Korean judoka.

He won Asian bronze medal in the half-lightweight division in 1996 Asian Judo Championships.

References 

Living people
Olympic judoka of South Korea
Year of birth missing (living people)
Judoka at the 1996 Summer Olympics
South Korean male judoka